SportPlus is a Greek language sports channel that airs the best sporting leagues and competitions from Greece. It is the first 24-hour sports channel in the world aimed at the Greek diaspora.

SportPlus airs live and tape delayed matches from Greek Super League, Football League and Basket League. It also airs news and highlights shows.

Availability
SportPlus originally launched on 24 August 2014 in the United States on Dish Network. It subsequently launched in Australia on the MySat platform. On 26 March 2015, SportPlus launched in Canada on Bell Fibe TV via a partnership with Odyssey Television Network.

External links
Official site 

Television channels in Greece
Greek-language television stations
Television channels and stations established in 2014